Cicely Pearl Blair FRCP (née Hopton; 20 May 1926 – 14 February 2005) was a British dermatologist. She discovered that people who had albinism did not get blackheads, as they did not produce melanin, the pigment that makes the comedones black. She also wrote about rashes caused by brown-tailed moth caterpillars. After her retirement, she turned her hand to art and especially silver smithing, fashioning a "chain of office" for the president of the British Association of Dermatologists.

Early life
Blair was born Cicely Pearl Hopton on 20 May 1926 in Huddersfield, West Yorkshire. Her father, John Isaac Hopton, and her mother were both teachers. She attended Greenhead High School in Huddersfield before studying at the Royal Free Hospital School of Medicine in London. In 1951, she qualified as a medical practitioner, gaining posts first at the Royal Free Hospital and then at the London Jewish Hospital. In 1954, she married Henry Blair and the couple moved into general practice in Chingford, East London and remained in the role for 15 years. In 1969, the couple left general practice to focus on research, Cicely in dermatology and Henry in allergies.

Dermatology

Blair left general practice in 1969 to focus on the study of dermatology. Over the next few years, she worked in a number of roles including a spell as a research assistant at St Bartholomew's Hospital. Whilst at St Bartholomew's, she focussed on acne research, discovering that the pigment in blackhead comedones is melanin and therefore that patients with albinism did not suffer from blackheads.

In 1974, she became a consultant at Oldchurch Hospital in Romford. There she continued her research, at one point publishing a paper on rashes which could be caused by caterpillars of the brown-tailed moth. Whilst at Oldchurch, Blair took an active interest in fundraising for the dermatology department. She is credited with setting up a number of events, which allowed the department to purchase an expensive PUVA machine.

Retirement
Blair's husband, Henry, died in 1984 and as the couple had not had any children, she was free to focus on her own interests when she retired. She became an amateur silversmith, winning prizes for her sculptures and going on to make the "chain of office" for the president of the British Association of Dermatologists. She joined the Medical Art Society as a painter and spent time photographing flora and fauna, especially in the Galapagos and Falkland Islands. Blair died aged 78 on 14 February 2005 in London after an accident.

Works

References

1926 births
2005 deaths
British dermatologists
Alumni of the UCL Medical School
People from Huddersfield
Medical doctors from Yorkshire
Fellows of the Royal College of Physicians